Q35 may refer to:
 Q35 (New York City bus)
 Changhe Q35, a Chinese crossover
 Fatir, the 35th surah of the Quran
 
 London Underground Q35 Stock
 Samsung Sens Q35, a laptop computer
 Intel Q35, an Intel chipset